Compulsory education refers to a period of education that is required of all people and is imposed by the government. This education may take place at a registered school or at other places.

Compulsory school attendance or compulsory schooling means that parents are obliged to send their children to a certain school.

The International Covenant on Economic, Social and Cultural Rights requires, within a reasonable number of years, the principle of compulsory education free of charge for all. All countries except Bhutan, Papua New Guinea, Solomon Islands, and Vatican City have compulsory education.

Purpose 
At the start of the 20th century, compulsory education was to master physical skills which are necessary and can be contributed to the nation. It also instilled values of ethics and social communications abilities in teenagers, it would allow immigrants to fit in the unacquainted society of a new country. Nowadays, compulsory education has been considered as a right of every citizen in many countries.

It is mostly used to advance the education of all citizens, minimize the number of students who stop going to school because of family economic reasons, and balance the education differences between rural and urban areas.

The overall correlation between the level of access to education in a country and the skills of its student population is weak. This disconnect between education access and education quality may be the consequence of weak capacity to implement education policies or lack of information on the part of policymakers on how to promote student learning. In other situations, governments might be intentionally motivated to provide education for reasons that have nothing to do with improving the knowledge and skills of citizens. On the other hand, in countries with a republican system of government, being educated is necessary and important for every citizen.

Throughout history, compulsory education laws have typically been the latest form of education intervention enacted by states. In general, governments in Europe and Latin America began to intervene in primary education an average of 107 years before democratization as measured by Polity. Compulsory education laws, despite being one of the last measures introduced by central governments seeking to regulate primary education, nevertheless were implemented an average of 52 years before democratization as measured by Polity and 36 years before universal male suffrage.

Historically, there is a trend of mass education being introduced in the aftermath of civil wars. According to a 2022 study, nondemocracies frequently introduced mass education to teach obedience and respect for authority.

History

Antiquity to medieval times

Compulsory education was not unheard of in ancient times. However instances are generally tied to royal, religious or military organization—substantially different from modern notions of compulsory education.

Plato's The Republic (c. 424–c. 348 BCE) is credited with having popularized the concept of compulsory education in Western intellectual thought. Plato's rationale was straightforward. The ideal city would require ideal individuals, and ideal individuals would require an ideal education. 
The popularization of Plato's ideas began with the wider Renaissance and the translation of Plato's works by Marsilio Ficino (1434–1499), culminating in the Enlightenment. The Enlightenment philosopher Jean-Jacques Rousseau, known for his own work on education (including Emile, or On Education), said, 'To get a good idea of public education, read Plato's Republic. It is not a political treatise, as those who merely judge books by their title think, but it is the finest, most beautiful work on education ever written.'

In Sparta boys between the age 6 and 7 left their homes and were sent to military school. School courses were harsh and have been described as a "brutal training period". Between the age of 18 and 20, Spartan males had to pass a test that consisted of fitness, military ability, and leadership skills. A student's failure meant a forfeiture of citizenship and political rights. Passing was a rite of passage to manhood and citizenry, in which he would continue to serve in the military and train as a soldier until the age of 60 when the soldier could retire to live with his family.

Every parent in Judea since ancient times was required to teach their children at least informally. Over the centuries, as cities, towns and villages developed, a class of teachers called Rabbis evolved. According to the Talmud (tractate Bava Bathra 21a), which praises the sage Joshua ben Gamla with the institution of formal Jewish education in the 1st century AD, Ben Gamla instituted schools in every town and made formal education compulsory from age 6 to 8.

The Aztec Triple Alliance, which ruled from 1428 to 1521 in what is now central Mexico, is considered to be the first state to implement a system of universal compulsory education.

Early Modern Era

The Protestant Reformation prompted the establishment of compulsory education for boys and girls, first in regions that are now part of Germany, and later in Europe and in the United States.

Martin Luther's seminal text An die Ratsherren aller Städte deutschen Landes (To the Councillors of all Towns in German Countries, 1524) called for establishing compulsory schooling so that all parishioners would be able to read the Bible by themselves. The Protestant South-West of the Holy Roman Empire soon followed suit. In 1559, the German Duchy Württemberg established a compulsory education system for boys. In 1592, the German Duchy Palatine Zweibrücken became the first territory in the world with compulsory education for girls and boys, followed in 1598 by Strasbourg, then a free city of the Holy Roman Empire and now part of France.

In Scotland, the School Establishment Act of 1616 commanded every parish to establish a school for everyone paid for by parishioners. The Parliament of Scotland confirmed this with the Education Act of 1633 and created a local land-based tax to provide the required funding. The required majority support of parishioners, however, provided a tax evasion loophole which heralded the Education Act of 1646. The turmoil of the age meant that in 1661 there was a temporary reversion to the less compulsory 1633 position. However, in 1696 a new Act re-established the compulsory provision of a school in every parish with a system of fines, sequestration, and direct government implementation as a means of enforcement where required, making Scotland the first country with national compulsory education.

In the United States, following Luther and other Reformers, the Separatist Congregationalists who founded Plymouth Colony in 1620, obliged parents to teach their children how to read and write. The Massachusetts School Laws, three legislative acts enacted in the Massachusetts Bay Colony in 1642, 1647, and 1648, are commonly regarded as the first steps toward compulsory education in the United States. The 1647 law, in particular, required every town having more than 50 families to hire a teacher, and every town of more than 100 families to establish a school. The Puritan zeal for learning was reflected in the early and rapid rise of educational institutions; e.g., Harvard College was founded as early as 1636.

Prussia implemented a modern compulsory education system in 1763. It was introduced by the Generallandschulreglement (General School Regulation), a decree of Frederick the Great in 1763–5. The Generallandschulreglement, authored by Johann Julius Hecker, asked for all young citizens, girls and boys, to be educated from age 5 to age 13–14 and to be provided with a basic outlook on (Christian) religion, singing, reading and writing based on a regulated, state-provided curriculum of text books. The teachers, often former soldiers, were asked to cultivate silk worms to make a living besides contributions from the local citizens and municipalities.

In Austria, Hungary and the Lands of the Bohemian Crown (Czech lands), mandatory primary education was introduced by Empress Maria Theresa in 1774.

Late Modern Era

Compulsory school attendance based on the Prussian model gradually spread to other countries. It was quickly adopted by the governments in Denmark-Norway and Sweden, and also in Finland, Estonia and Latvia within the Russian Empire, and later England and Wales and France.

Due to population growth and the proliferation of compulsory education, UNESCO calculated in 2006 that over the subsequent 30 years, more people would receive formal education than in all prior human history.

France
France was slow to introduce compulsory education, this time due to conflicts between the secular state and the Catholic Church,[20] and as a result between anti-clerical and Catholic political parties. During the July Monarchy, government officials proposed a variety of public primary education provisions, culminating in the Guizot Law of 28 June 1833. The Guizot law mandated that all communes provide education for boys and required that schools implement a curriculum focused on religious and moral instruction. The first set of Jules Ferry Laws, passed in 1881, extended the central government's role in education well beyond the provisions of the Guizot Law, and made primary education free for girls and boys. In 1882, the second set of Jules Ferry Laws made education compulsory for girls and boys until the age of 13. In 1936, the upper age limit was raised to 14. In 1959, it was further extended to 16.

United States
In 1852, Massachusetts was the first U.S. state to pass a compulsory universal public education law. In particular, the Massachusetts General Court required every town to create and operate a grammar school. Fines were imposed on parents who did not send their children to school, and the government took the power to take children away from their parents and apprentice them to others if government officials decided that the parents were "unfit to have the children educated properly." In 1918, Mississippi became the last state to enact a compulsory attendance law.

In 1922 an attempt was made by the voters of Oregon to enact the Oregon Compulsory Education Act, which would require all children between the ages of 8 and 16 to attend public schools, only leaving exceptions for mentally or physically unfit children, exceeding a certain living distance from a state school, or having written consent from a county superintendent to receive private instruction. The law was passed by popular vote but was later ruled unconstitutional by the United States Supreme Court in Pierce v. Society of Sisters, determining that "a child is not a mere creature of the state." This case settled the dispute about whether or not private schools had the right to do business and educate within the United States.

Russia/USSR

In the Soviet Union, a compulsory education provision law was implemented in 1930. State-provided education during this era was primarily focused on eradicating illiteracy. In line with the overall goals of the regime's Five Year Plans, the motivation behind education provision and literacy instruction was to ”train a new generation of technically skilled and scientifically literate citizens.” Industrial development needed more skilled workers of all kinds. No possible source of talent could be left untapped, and the only way of meeting these needs was by the rapid development of a planned system of mass education.” Soviet schools “responded to the economic requirements of society” by emphasizing “basic formation in math, and polytechnic knowledge related to economic production.” The Soviet regime's deliberate expansion of mass education supremacy was what most impressed the U.S. education missions to the USSR in the 1950s.

China
China's nine-year compulsory education was formally established in 1986 as part of its economic modernization program. It was designed to promote "universalization", the closure of the education gap by economic development and between rural and urban areas by provision of safe and high-quality schools. The program initially faced shortages due to a huge population and weak economic foundation, but by 1999 primary and junior middle schools respectively served 90% and 85% of the national population.

Timeline of introduction

1700s 
 1739: 
 1763: 
 1774:

1800s 
1805: 
1814: 
1817: 
1824: ,
1834: 
1841: 
1842: 
1844: 
1852: 
1857: 
1864: , 
1867: 
1868: 
1870: 
1872: ,   (de facto unenforceable), 
1873: , 
1878: 
1879: 
1882: , 
1884: 
1885: 
1886:  (abolished)
1887: , 
1890: , 
1891: 
1892: 
1895: 
1896: , 
1899: ,

1900s 
1900: , 
1902: , 
1904: 
1906:  (white children with less than 4 km to nearest school only)
1908: 
1910: , 
1912: 
1913: 
1917: , 
1918: 
1919: ,  (only for children with less than 3 km to nearest school), 
1921: , 
1923: 
1924: 
1925: 
1926: 
1927:  (reintroduced)
1929: 
1930: , 
1935: 
1942: 
1943: , 
1946: 
1949: 
1951: 
1952: 
1953: , 
1956:  (all children)
1960: 
1961: 
1962: , 
1963: , 
1964:  (children with less than three miles to nearest school)
1965: 
1968: 
1971: 
1973: 
1975: 
1976: ,
1981: , 
1986: 
1988: , 
1991: 
1994: 
1996: ,  (abolished for women)
1998: ,

2000s 
2000: 
2001:  (reintroduced for women), 
2005: 
2007: 
2008: , 
2009:  (enforceable misdemeanor, unenforceable prior to 2009)
2010: 
2021:  (secondary school abolished for women)

Countries without compulsory education

By country

The following table indicates at what ages compulsory education starts and ends in different countries. The most common age for starting compulsory education is 6, but that varies between 3 and 8.

Criticism

While compulsory education is mostly seen as important and useful, compulsory schooling is seen by some as obsolete and counterproductive in today's world and has repeatedly been the subject of sharp criticism. Critics of compulsory schooling argue that such education violates the freedom of children; is a method of political control; is ineffective at teaching children how to deal with the "real world" outside of school; and may have negative effects on children, leading to higher rates of apathy, bullying, stress, and depression.

See also
Child labour
Democratic education
History of education
Raising of school leaving age
State school
Unschooling

References

Further reading

Coleman, J. S., et al. (1966). Equality of Educational Opportunity. Washington: U.S. Government Printing Office.
 
Paglayan, A. (2020). "The Non-Democratic Roots of Mass Education: Evidence from 200 Years." American Political Science Review.
Van Horn Melton, J. (1988). Absolutism and the Eighteenth-Century Origins of Compulsory Schooling in Prussia and Austria Cambridge: Cambridge University Press.
White, John (1876). "The Laws on Compulsory Education," The Fortnightly Review, Vol. XXV, pp. 897–918.

External links

 A discussion of compulsory education as a human right (Right to education Project)

 
Education policy
Youth rights